"Back Where I Come From" is a song written and recorded by American country music artist Mac McAnally.  It was released in January 1990 as the first single from his album Simple Life.  The song reached number 14 on the Billboard Hot Country Singles & Tracks chart. Its B-side, "Company Time", was later a single for Linda Davis in 1994.

Content
The song is a mid-tempo in which the narrator expresses nostalgia towards his hometown in Mississippi. Regarding its content, McAnally told American Songwriter, "When I wrote 'Back Where I Come From' I thought that it was a hit, but also that it said something that I personally wanted to be the first to say." The song, the first cut on Simple Life, has a play length of 3 minutes and 32 seconds; a 1-minute and 20 second reprise, performed by McAnally on piano with backing from the Nashville String Machine, is the album's sixth track.

Cover versions
"Back Where I Come From" was covered by Kenny Chesney on his 1996 album Me and You, produced by Barry Beckett. Chesney also included a live version of the song on his 2000 Greatest Hits album. Of Chesney's recordings, McAnally said that "As a publisher I knew I was devaluing the copyright by singing it myself instead of passing it onto better and bigger singers, but I did it anyway. One of many of my classically bad business choices, but thankfully Kenny Chesney was kind enough to bail me out and cut it again."

Personnel (Mac McAnally)
From Simple Life liner notes.
 Eddie Bayers - drums
 Vince Gill - background vocals
 Mac McAnally - vocals, acoustic guitar, electric guitar, keyboards
 "The Mississippi Choir" (Tammy Wynette, J. Fred Knobloch, Tricia Walker, Johnny Crocker, Mark Gray) - background vocals
 Steve Nathan - keyboards
 Mark O'Connor - fiddle
 Tom Roady - percussion
 Leland Sklar - bass guitar

Chart performance (Mac McAnally)

Certifications (Kenny Chesney)

References

1990 singles
1996 singles
Mac McAnally songs
Kenny Chesney songs
Songs written by Mac McAnally
Song recordings produced by Jim Ed Norman
Warner Records singles
1990 songs
Songs about Mississippi